John Johnson (March 25, 1842 – April 3, 1907) served in the Union Army during the American Civil War. He received the Medal of Honor for his actions during the Battle of Antietam and the Battle of Fredericksburg.

Johnson was born on March 25, 1842 in Norway. His official residence was listed as Janesville, Wisconsin.

Johnson was a member of the 2nd Wisconsin Volunteer Infantry Regiment, part of the Iron Brigade. He earned his medal of honor for valor displayed at the Battle of Antietam and the Battle of Fredericksburg. During the Battle of Fredericksburg, while loading a cannon, Confederate artillery fire severed his right arm. He continued to load with his left arm until blood loss caused him to faint. He was discharged from the Army on April 10, 1863.

He died April 3, 1907 and is buried in Rock Creek Cemetery, Washington, D.C.

Medal of Honor citation
His award citation reads:
Conspicuous gallantry in battle in which he was severely wounded [Fredericksburg]. While serving as cannoneer he manned the positions of fallen gunners [Antietam].

See also

List of Medal of Honor recipients

References

External links

1842 births
1907 deaths
Norwegian emigrants to the United States
People from Janesville, Wisconsin
Military personnel from Wisconsin
People of Wisconsin in the American Civil War
United States Army Medal of Honor recipients
Norwegian-born Medal of Honor recipients
Union Army soldiers
American Civil War recipients of the Medal of Honor
Burials at Rock Creek Cemetery
American amputees